Adnan Şenses (21 August 1935 – 25 December 2013) was a Turkish musician and actor.

Biography
Şenses was born on 21 August 1935 in Bursa. He was schooled in Ankara and continued his education later at Karagümrük neighborhood of Fatih district in Istanbul. In 1956, he began his singing career. Şenses was employed by Radio Ankara, where he served 16 years long. Then, he appeared on the stage of many major music halls, and played in a total of 47 Yeşilçam films. He released 54 rpms, 29 (7 of them were LPs) albums during his music career.

Death
Şenses died of respiratory failure on 25 December 2013 at the age of 78 in an Istanbul hospital after two weeks of hospitalization. He had been suffering from stomach cancer for about three years.

He was buried at the Zincirlikuyu Cemetery following a religious funeral held at Teşvikiye Mosque. He was survived by his wife Lale Şenses.

Discography

Filmography

See also
 List of Turkish musicians

References

External links
 

1935 births
2013 deaths
Turkish male film actors
People from Bursa
Turkish male singers
Turkish lyricists
Deaths from cancer in Turkey
Deaths from stomach cancer
Respiratory disease deaths in Turkey
Deaths from respiratory failure
Burials at Zincirlikuyu Cemetery
Golden Butterfly Award winners